Relationship anarchy (sometimes abbreviated RA) is the application of anarchist principles to intimate relationships. Its values include autonomy, anti-hierarchical practices, anti-normativity, and community interdependence. RA is explicitly anti-amatonormative and anti-mononormative and is commonly, but not always, non-monogamous. This is distinct from polyamory, solo poly, swinging, and other forms of “dating”, which may include structures such as amatonormativity, hierarchy of intimate relationships, and autonomy-limiting rules. It has also been interpreted as a new paradigm in which closeness and autonomy are no longer considered to create dilemmas within a relationship.

History
Andie Nordgren popularized the term "relationship anarchy" in her 2012 Tumblr essay "The short instructional manifesto for relationship anarchy", which she translated from her own Swedish-language "Relationsanarki i 8 punkter" (lit. Relationship anarchy in 8 points). Other relevant writings exploring this topic within a similar time frame include "A Green Anarchist Project on Freedom" and "Love and Against the Couple Form".

Workshops at OpenCon 2010 discussed relationship anarchy, and the Open University professor Dr. Meg Barker discussed it in a 2013 presentation. In the International Non-Monogamies and Contemporary Intimacies Conferences, since 2016, different aspects of relationship anarchy have been studied. In March 2020, the first book dedicated monographically to RA was published in Spanish: "Anarquía Relacional. La revolución desde los vínculos", translated into English in 2022 as "Relationship Anarchy. Occupy Intimacy"

See also
 Anarcha-feminism
 Anarchism and issues related to love and sex
 Free love within Anarchism
 Queer anarchism

References

Anarchist culture
Anarchist theory
Interpersonal relationships
Intimate relationships
Free love
Polyamory
Sexual fidelity
Sexuality and society